Benton is a home rule-class city in Marshall County, Kentucky, United States. The current mayor of this city is Rita Dotson. The population was 4,756 at the 2020 census. It is the county seat of Marshall County.

History
Benton was founded in 1842 by John Bearden and Francis H. Clayton. The town was named for Thomas Hart Benton, a senator from Missouri. Benton was then incorporated in 1845. 

In 1908, Benton drove its African American residents out of town, becoming a sundown town along with the rest of Marshall County.

On January 23, 2018, a mass shooting occurred at Marshall County High School, near Benton, resulting in 19 injuries and 2 fatalities.

On December 10, 2021, the town was hit by the 2021 Western Kentucky Tornado.

Geography
Benton lies in the center of the county encompassing the hills just south and west of Clarks River. Benton is the county seat of Marshall county, in the far western region of west Kentucky known as the Jackson purchase.

Demographics

As of the 2010 Census, there were 4,349 people, 1,809 households, and 1,154 families residing in the city. The racial makeup of the city was 97.4% White (96.4% non-Hispanic), 0.4% African American, 0.1% Native American and Alaska Native, 0.6% Asian, 0.6% from other races, and 0.9% from two or more races. Hispanics or Latinos of any race were 1.8% of the population.

There were 1,809 households, out of which 27.2% had children under the age of 18 living with them, 48.5% were married couples living together, 11.4% had a female householder with no husband present, 3.9% had a male householder with no wife present, and 36.2% were non-families. 33.2% of all households were made up of individuals, and 17.1% had someone living alone who was 65 years of age or older. The average household size was 2.26 and the average family size was 2.84.

The age distribution was 21.5% under 18, 7.7% from 18 to 24, 26.1% from 25 to 44, 23.4% from 45 to 64, and 21.4% who were 65 or older. The median age was 40.5 years. For every 100 females, there were 89.7 males. For every 100 females age 18 and over, there were 86.7 males.

Based on 2008–2012 estimates from the American Community Survey, the median income for a household in the city was $42,342, and the median income for a family was $62,500. Among full-time workers, males had a median income of $47,895 versus $29,272 for females. The per capita income for the city was $21,959. About 4.5% of families and 8.4% of the population were below the poverty line, including 5.3% of those under age 18 and 10.7% of those age 65 or over.

Culture
Shape note singers gather annually at Benton on the fourth Sunday in May to sing from a tunebook called The Southern Harmony. This event, organized in 1884 and called The Big Singing or Big Singing Day, is the oldest continuous Southern Harmony singing in the United States.

Tater Day
Tater Day was started in 1843 as a celebration of spring, and a time when all of the townsfolk would get together and trade in sweet potato slips, used to grow the plants. It is also the oldest continuous trade day in the United States, in which goods such as guns, 'coon hounds, tobacco, or livestock are swapped or sold. Tater Day brings to town carnival rides, games, a market, a potato eating contest, mule pulls, and a "biggest potato" contest, which attracts large potatoes from across the county. The biggest part of the festival is the parade, which completes one circuit around the town. It includes political floats, Marshall County High School marching band, horses and buggies, clowns, vintage cars, horses, Miss Tater Day, and other things for which Marshall County is known. There is also Junior Miss Tater Day for little girls ages 5 to 12, and Little Mister, Tiny Miss, and Baby Miss Tater day pageants and floats for the younger kids. There is also an annual Tater day derby that is hosted at the dirt track at the Benton City Park.

Education
Benton is part of the Marshall County School District. There are 11 schools in the district, not including the technical school that is incorporated with Marshall County High School, the district's only secondary educational institution.  For the 2011 to 2012 school year, there were approximately 4,838 students enrolled in the district.

Benton has a lending library, a branch of the Marshall County Public Library.

References

External links

Cities in Kentucky
Cities in Marshall County, Kentucky
County seats in Kentucky
Sundown towns in Kentucky